Snuff may refer to:

Tobacco
 Snuff (tobacco), fine-ground tobacco, sniffed into the nose
 Moist snuff or dipping tobacco
 Creamy snuff, an Indian tobacco paste

Media and entertainment
 Snuff film, a type of film that shows a murder

Literature

 Snuff (Palahniuk novel), a 2008 novel by Chuck Palahniuk
 Snuff (Pratchett novel), a 2011 Discworld novel by Terry Pratchett
 S.N.U.F.F., a 2011 science fiction novel by Viktor Pelevin

Music
 Snuff (band), British band
 Snuff (country rock band), US band active in the early 1980s
  "Snuff" (song), a song by Slipknot
 "Snuff", a song by Slayer from World Painted Blood
 Snuff Garrett (born 1938), American record producer

Other
 Snuff (film), a 1976 splatter film
 Snuff (wrestler)
 "Snuff" (CSI), an episode of the TV series CSI: Crime Scene Investigation

See also
 Anatomical snuffbox, on the human hand
 Naswar, a moist tobacco product placed under the lower lip similar to snuff, used in Afghanistan, Iran, Pakistan, India, Sweden, Kazakhstan, Uzbekistan, Tajikistan and Kyrgyzstan
 Snuff Box, a BBC3 comedy
 Snus, a moist tobacco product placed under the upper lip, used in Sweden, Denmark and Norway
 Snuffy (disambiguation)